These are the results of the Junior Women's Single Sculls event at the 2010 Summer Youth Olympics.

Medalists

Schedule
All times are China Standard Time (UTC+8)

Results

Heats
Qualification Rules: 1->SA/B, 2..->R

Heat 1
August 15, 10:00

Heat 2
August 15, 10:10

Heat 3
August 15, 10:20

Heat 4
August 15, 10:30

Repechage
Qualification Rules: 1-2->SA/B, 3..->SC/D

Repechage 1
August 16, 10:30

Repechage 2
August 16, 10:40

Repechage 3
August 16, 10:50

Repechage 4
August 16, 11:00

Semifinals C/D
Qualification Rules: 1-3->FC, 4..->FD

Semifinal C/D 1
August 17, 10:00

Semifinal C/D 2
August 17, 10:10

Semifinals A/B
Qualification Rules: 1-3->FA, 4..->FB

Semifinal A/B 1
August 17, 10:45

Semifinal A/B 2
August 17, 10:55

Finals

Final D
August 18, 10:00

Final C
August 18, 10:20

Final B
August 18, 10:40

Final A
August 18, 11:30

References
 Results Page

Rowing at the 2010 Summer Youth Olympics